The Garthdee campus is the Robert Gordon University's main campus, where all academic departments are located and teaching and research takes place. The campus is located in parkland on the outskirts of the city of Aberdeen and noted for its modern architecture. For the university's historic Administration Building in Aberdeen city centre, see the main article.

The Garthdee campus is situated in the south-west of the city, on the banks of the River Dee. For much of its history it was a greenfield site, with parts used as the gardens and estate of the manor of Garthdee House, farmland, and open meadows. The first university buildings were in use from the 1950s, with major additional developments in the 1960s, 1990s, 2000s and early 2010s. The design concept produced in the mid-1990s by architects Norman Foster + Partners was to separate the site into three zones; to the north, by the road, would be car parking; a central zone would contain the main buildings, and the southern boundary by the riverbank would be for parkland and wildlife. Ancient lines of beech trees and woodlands were retained in the concept. It also included a "university street" running east-west and connecting the buildings, which were to be "pavilions in the landscape". These elements of the design concept have been more or less adhered to in subsequent developments by other architects.

History of site

Visible today are the signs of the campus's past as an area of agriculture, a wealthy estate, and industry. The campus today incorporates areas that were formerly in separate ownership. The western end of the campus, up to approximately the Business School building, was the estate of a Victorian manor called Garthdee House. The estate stretched along the river and was owned by a number of private owners until donated to the institution by the architect Tom Scott Sutherland in 1954. The house still stands and today houses the Principal's Office (see below). This area is characterised by a planned estate landscape.

Garthdee Estate

Although in suburbs today, the campus stands on an area previously known as Kaim Hill which had been part of the rural Pitfodels Estate, also known as the "Lands of Pitfodels". This estate stretched from the Bridge of Dee in the east to Cults in the west, from the bank of the River Dee a considerable distance north of what today is Garthdee Road, which had in times past been a turnpike (i.e. a toll road). Since the mediaeval era this estate been in the possession of the Menzies family - a dynasty of powerful landowners who also held political power in Aberdeen, with members of the family often serving as Lord Provost of the city. The estate included a castle abandoned in 1622 known as Pitfodels Castle, whose probable location is close to the west of the present-day Gray's School of Art building on campus. The last laird of the estate, John Menzies, began to sell off some of the land as feu in 1805. He died in Edinburgh in 1843 without any descendants and the remaining estate was purchased by the Pitfodels Land Company who divided it up into plots, four of which were sold for the development of a country villa. He bequeathed much of the rest of the family fortune to the Roman Catholic Church. A number of these Victorian villas still stand in the vicinity of the campus and include Norwood House (currently a hotel) on the site of the ruined Pitfodels Castle (immediately west of the present-day campus), and Inchgarth House. Each plot of land formed its own estate, with a villa, gardens and land that could be rented out for farming. The last (and easternmost) of the plots was purchased by John Moir Clark, who owned a successful food canning business. He named his villa Garthdee House, and also applied the Garthdee name to its associated farms. Over time, the whole surrounding area became known as Garthdee. By the end of the 19th century:

By 1953, Garthdee House had changed ownership several times (see Garthdee House section below) and it had come into the possession of Tom Scott Sutherland, an architect, businessman and property developer from Aberdeen. Scott Sutherland had trained as an architect at the Aberdeen School of Architecture, which was part of Gray's School of Art which in turn was part of Robert Gordon's Technical College, a predecessor of the Robert Gordon University. He qualified with a diploma in architecture in 1923 and became a successful businessman, which was his main interest although he also owned an architecture practice. He moved into Garthdee House with his wife Georgina Scott Sutherland, but they found it too big for two people. Through personal and business contacts with the Aberdeen School of Architecture, Scott Sutherland knew that the school desperately needed additional space because the Gray's School of Art building next to the Aberdeen Art Gallery in the city centre (which later became the university's Administration Building) had become much too small. He donated the whole Garthdee estate to the School of Architecture and after leasing the house back for a short time, he and his wife moved out in 1955; the School was subsequently renamed after him. As the architecture school was part of Robert Gordon's Technical College, the institution (and later the university) became the main owner of the land. Over time, it purchased additional neighboring land. At the time of Scott Sutherland's land donation, the site consisted mainly of open fields, often let out to tenant farmers, and the houses that characterise Garthdee as a suburb today had not yet been built. After extending Garthdee House (see below), the School of Architecture held its first classes there in 1957. Between 1966 and 2013, all other departments of the college (later to become Robert Gordon's Institute of Technology and then the Robert Gordon University) moved to Garthdee.

Eastern part of campus

The eastern part of the site was not part of Scott Sutherland's Garthdee estate, although it too had historically been part of the Pitfodels estate which had been divided up and sold in the 19th century. It has had a number of uses, and was owned by Aberdeen City Council until the university purchased it in stages beginning in 1996. 

When the Robert Gordon University achieved university status in 1992, it had numerous small campuses scattered around the city of Aberdeen, often consisting of one or two buildings each housing a single department; many (but not all) of these buildings were of low quality. Its largest campus, Schoolhill in Aberdeen city centre, was still shared with Robert Gordon's College. The university's Vice-Principal at the time, Gavin Ross, was an architect who had trained under the influential American modernist architect Louis Kahn. Ross decided that this was not satisfactory and set the university on a twenty-year plan to consolidate the numerous campuses onto one large, expanded campus at Garthdee; this was achieved fully only in 2013. Ross appreciated the value of high-quality architecture and commissioned major architects to design showpiece buildings for the expanded Garthdee campus.

While the university already owned the western part of the campus, the eastern sections had to be purchased in stages. Viewed from above, the eastern part of the site is characterised by strips of land divided by lines of beech trees running north–south, with these lines of trees now broken in some areas by campus buildings or other development. These fields indicate that the land had been used for farming. By 1904, Ordnance Survey maps showed the eastern end of the present campus (approximately where the Medical Centre and Sir Ian Wood building now stand) was mined as a gravel pit. This was abandoned just a few decades later and the area was landscaped to create a caravan park. This included covering over the abandoned gravel pit and installing areas of hard standing, in addition to retaining areas of grass as well as part of the lines of beech trees that had not been felled for the gravel pit. Satellite imagery of the site from 2001 shows the caravan park's areas of hard-standing and connecting roads, prior to construction of the Medical Centre (which opened in 2004), with the Faculty of Health and Social Care building mid-way through construction. The caravan park was operated by the City Council along with another at Hazlehead Park, but according to council planning documents, it had closed some 20 years prior to the university's purchase of the site and lay derelict until then. Between the caravan park and the Victorian estate, the council used the land for allotments; a document proposing draft routes for the Aberdeen Western Peripheral Route, published in 1992 by Grampian Regional Council, describes how one possible route could have cut through the site of the present campus. It would have left the main road at the site of the caravan park, then crossed a field, and then traversed the "Garthdee Road allotments" which the report describes as "worked at present" - from there, the route would cut through the land of the Scott Sutherland School of Architecture which by then stood on the Victorian estate. Minutes of the city's resources management committee show that the university began to purchase the council's holding of land from the edge of the Victorian estate to the abandoned caravan park site in parcels, with purchases in 1996 (for the Business School building), 2000 (for the Faculty of Health and Social Care building), 2002 (for the Medical Centre) and around 2007 for the remainder of the site (for construction of the Sir Ian Wood building).

The campus today

The Garthdee campus has seen major investment in recent years, with numerous new buildings constructed since the late 1990s which include a "University Street", part of Norman Foster's design concept for the modern campus. 

According to the university's masterplan for the campus, the Waterside Farm site is at a low level and lies in a 1:200 year floodplain. A lifeboat was brought by road from Aberdeen Harbour, launched at Banchory-Devenick some way up the River Dee, and sailed down the river to the farm. The lifeboat crew rescued the trio from the rising floodwaters, plus a kitten and the farm dog. This could not have been the first such occurrence, because the farmer claimed to keep a small boat for when the farm was flooded, but it had been washed away by the torrent. Perhaps as a result of this history of flooding, the Waterside Farm site has been identified as a location for university sports pitches at a future stage of development, to be connected to the main campus on the north bank by a pedestrian/cycle bridge across the river. Urban explorers have investigated the abandoned farm buildings, and posted photographs showing them to be derelict. The main campus is a significant height above the River Dee and is not susceptible to flooding. Main buildings are listed below in order from east to west.

Main plaza and University Street 

Part of the original 1990s masterplan for the site by Norman Foster was for buildings to be in a line running east to west, along a path known as the University Street. Campus planning around a central "spine" or "street" had been much discussed in the 1960s and was a hallmark of many of the successful new campus universities of that time, albeit with more densely-packed buildings, such as University of Lancaster and University of Bath, and is successful as the idea of a street is readily accepted by pedestrians and allows new developments to be added along the route as the campus grows. At RGU, the University Street begins at the main plaza where the Sir Ian Wood building, Faculty of Health and Social Care building and campus health centre meet. The main campus bus stop is also located here and so the plaza forms the main arrival point to the university. From here the University Street leads west, passing through the winter garden of the RGU:Sport building (past the Student Union) and through the atrium of the Business School. It ends at the Gray's School of Art building.

Sir Ian Wood building (formerly Riverside East)

The Sir Ian Wood building opened in late summer 2013, although the University Library it also houses had opened some months earlier. For the first two years, it was known as the Riverside East building, until on 2 July 2015 it was officially opened by Anne, Princess Royal and named in honour of Sir Ian Wood, the oil industry businessman and chancellor of the university. It is the largest building at the university (34,000 square metres) and houses all academic departments previously located at the City Centre campus. The Ian Wood building is situated at the east end of the Garthdee campus, and designed by the major British architectural firm Building Design Partnership (BDP). Construction began in May 2011 and at a cost of £50 million, with later phases to follow as part of a larger planned development known by the university as "The Masterplan". The most recent such phase of extension began construction in March 2014.

The Sir Ian Wood building provides classrooms, lecture theatres and other teaching facilities, research laboratories, student facilities, social space, and catering facilities to replace those previously at the City Centre. Offices and staff of the Schools of Engineering, Computing Science & Digital Media, and Pharmacy & Life Sciences are based here. In addition, the University Library is located here in the green Learning Tower. The development includes a large public plaza paved in granite, and a path leading down to the riverside. The building comprises two halves of five floors (north and south), separated by a vast curving atrium which runs the full length of the building and includes a grand staircase. The north section comprises Levels 2 to 6, while the south section faces the river and as a result is set slightly lower, at Levels 1 to 5. The main entrance from the campus plaza is on Level 3, entered through a modern interpretation of an archway, clad in black granite and lit at night with LED lights in bright colours. The large atrium includes a reception area and a large amphitheatre near the entrance which provides space for events and performances, while providing café-style seating when not required for events. Downstairs on Level 2, a large refectory and riverside terrace is located. The refectory provides a variety of eateries, including a branch of Costa Coffee. Level 2 also houses a small Student Union shop selling stationery, second-hand textbooks, and RGU-branded clothing and gifts, and a large space with grand staircase which is also used for university events. Classrooms, lecture theatres, laboratories and staff offices occupy the remaining space on Levels 1 to 6. In addition to these, a cylindrical tower clad in green glass provides an additional three levels above the main building for the University Library, for a total of nine floors. The entrance to the library is on Level 5. At the other (Eastern) end of the building, a green four-storey "Teaching Drum" provides lecture theatres, IT labs and multifunctional classrooms.

In Summer 2015, a five-storey extension to the east end of the building opened when the building as whole was renamed by the Princess Royal, housing the School of Architecture and all facilities needed for its staff and students, such as office space, classrooms, studios and IT labs. The 4,500 square-metre extension cost £9.5 million and replaces the Scott Sutherland building (see below).

Faculty of Health and Social Care building 

The Faculty of Health and Social Care building was designed by architects Halliday Fraser Munro of Aberdeen, and opened in 2002 at a cost of over £21 million. It provides 13,500 square-metres of accommodation for the Schools of Applied Social Studies, Nursing, Midwifery and Paramedic Practice and Health Sciences. The building also acts as a hub for student services, with the university's student helpdesk, careers service, disability and dyslexia service, accommodation office and counselling service located in facilities off the main atrium. The building comprises seven storeys, six of which are currently in use with the smaller seventh (top) level left unoccupied as an equipment/plant space and in case future expansion is required. Like the Business School building, it takes the form of a stepped-box set partially into the hillside with a curved roof stretching to the ground, with the main entrance on Level 4 and a full-height atrium dominating the centre of the building. Raised "bridges" connecting the two sides of the atrium on each floor serve as staff recreation areas.

RGU:SPORT building 

The RGU:SPORT building is a campus sports and fitness centre, designed by architectural firm Thomson Craig & Donald and opened in 2005 at a cost of £10.7 million, including support from organisations such as sportscotland. It provides extensive facilities for sport, exercise and physical training, including several gyms with facilities for cardiovascular and resistance training, a 25 metre swimming pool, climbing wall, studios for group exercise classes, and a large sports hall for a wide range of indoor sports. The main sports hall is also used for examinations and university events such as the annual Fresher's Fayre. Other community events are also held here, and a café is provided. The centre is open to the general public and RGU students. As well as sports and fitness facilities, the building houses a physiotherapy clinic, consultancy and other services which are available to members of the university community, athletes in training, and the general public. At the main entrances to the building where the "university street" passes through on the lower level, a winter garden acts as an atrium and to line the "street". The RGU Student Union offices are also located here just off the winter garden/University Street. As well as providing a covered thoroughfare, the winter garden is also used for university events (such as careers fairs) and has a pool observation area.

International College building 

The International College (ICRGU) building is a modular pre-fabricated two-storey building situated at the rear of RGU:Sport. It was constructed in 2011 to provide additional teaching space for the "International College at RGU" (ICRGU). This is a partnership with the Navitas Group , an Australian company which provides courses of study in its own colleges and arranges for students to continue their studies to degree level at various partner institutions in several English-speaking countries. The temporary building housing ICRGU was constructed in 2011 and has teaching facilities for these 400 students along with the administration and staff offices for the programme; it is not used for mainstream university classes. The modular units from which it is constructed are finished in plastic-coated galvanised steel in a dark red colour. Parking is not provided for students using this building and Aberdeen City Council have given planning permission for it to stand for only five years. After this time, ICRGU will move into the Sir Ian Wood building.

Aberdeen Business School building 

The Aberdeen Business School building was designed by architects Norman Foster and Partners. It opened in 1999, with construction having taken over a year and at a cost of £19.5 million. It provides 12,500 square-metres of academic space and other facilities. Its design is a response to the constraints and topography of the sloping riverbank site, and no part exceeds 15 metres above ground level. It was designed to allow numerous departments of the then-Faculty of Management to move from separate small campuses to one central site, along with a large library, and was originally known as the "Faculty of Management" building. In 1999 the building won a Royal Institute of British Architects (RIBA) Award for Architecture.

Today the building houses the departments of Accounting & Finance, Communication & Media, Information Management, Law, and Management, and a large Study Centre which occupies the former library space. It comprises a six-storey stepped box, partially set into the hillside, with each floor as a terrace following the topography of the site,  enclosed by a dramatic curved aluminium roof supported by steel beams and columns, which was designed as a response to the rolling landscape and trees at the site. The steel beams were standard units but specially curved by Angle Ring in England, and due to a university policy of using as many local materials and contractors as possible, were erected on site by a local firm. The building is clad in New Kemnay granite (the same as that used to build much of Aberdeen) alternating with infill panels of aluminium and glass. Inside, heavily used areas have protective dados of concrete blockwork to protect the walls, such as classrooms and corridors, while other materials include maple, glass, stainless steel handrails, and black slate for the atrium floor. The entrances are on Level 3, leading directly onto a four-storey atrium which the "university street" passes through.  The Study Centre (previously the Georgina Scott Sutherland Library) and other classrooms occupy the upper four storeys on the south side, and on the north side overlooking the atrium are staff offices. Teaching accommodation dominates the lowest two floors (much of which are underground), including three large lecture theatres of up to 300 seats as well as many other classrooms, IT labs and other facilities.

Until May 2013 (when the new University Library opened in the Sir Ian Wood building, then known as Riverside East) the university's main Georgina Scott Sutherland library was located here; the space now houses study areas optimised for group study, project work and individual study and is known as the Georgina Scott Sutherland Learning Centre.

Round Tower and Square Tower 
The only student accommodation on the campus is located in two small-scale towers known as the Round Tower and the Square Tower, close to the Scott Sutherland building. Designed by London-based architects Edward Jones and Jeremy Dixon and completed in 1993, they are inspired by traditional Scottish tower houses. The location on the campus was carefully selected to enhance the landscape, with the Round Tower placed at a slight curve in the river and the Square Tower at the end of an existing paved terrace. The construction is of concrete blocks covered by an external finish of harling, common on Scottish castles, and tinted pink as at Craigievar Castle in Aberdeenshire (approximately 27 miles/43 km to the west of the campus). In the seven-storey Round Tower each floor comprises a single apartment consisting of five student bedrooms and a kitchen with an inner "drum", originally clad in wood, containing two shared toilets. A semi-circular common area with balcony is found on the top floor with a roof terrace giving almost 360-degree views over the surrounding landscape. The five-storey Square Tower is similar, with a rectangular common area and roof terrace on the top floor. The cost of design and construction was twice as great as for a typical university hall of residence at the time, and paid by a donation from an anonymous benefactor. The Round Tower and Square Tower have received architectural acclaim by critics and are included in Prospect magazine's list of the 100 best Scottish modern buildings. When the list was published in 2005, the Round and Square Towers were the only buildings in Aberdeen to be included. The two towers won a Royal Institute of British Architects (RIBA) Regional Award in 1994.

Garthdee House 

Garthdee House is the location of the Principal's Office. It is a Victorian manor house which formed the core of the Garthdee estate, which with later purchases of adjacent land became today's campus. The architect was William Smith, who also designed Balmoral Castle. The building has Jacobean-style detailing, and was constructed in 1872 of granite ashlar blocks typical of Aberdeen architecture of the time. The interior was designed by Daniel Cottier, a pioneer of the Aesthetic movement in interior design, and Garthdee House has a fine interior with a grand hallway lit by a skylight, a grand staircase with a stained-glass window by Cottier depicting the Roman goddess Ceres, arcaded gallery on the upper floor, and ornate cornices and plasterwork with Corinthian columns and pilasters.

At the front of the house, the ground floor with two bay windows housed a grand drawing room and dining room. A manicured lawn stretched to the wooded slope to the riverbank; the Scott Sutherland building now stands on the site of this lawn. The building's first owner was John Moir Clark, who owned a successful canning and curing business, and he gave it the name Garthdee House, which later came to refer to the whole area. Later owners included Alexander Edmond, an advocate (i.e. lawyer) from Aberdeen and by 1907 Alexander Gray, a "home & foreign produce broker & provision & grain merchant" (sic) lived there.  The widow of John Webster sold it in 1953 to a company owned by Tom Scott Sutherland (see history of campus above). For two years he lived there with his wife, but they found it too big and he donated it, along with its estate, to the Aberdeen School of Architecture. The couple moved out in 1955. The School was subsequently renamed after Tom Scott Sutherland and extensions were constructed to provide the space needed. The Scott Sutherland School of Architecture was the sole occupant of Garthdee House from that time until 2013, when the Principal's Office became its main occupant. The School of Architecture moved to an extension of the Ian Wood building in Summer 2015.

Garthdee House Annexe (formerly the Scott Sutherland building)

The School of Architecture's mid-20th century extensions to Garthdee House became known as the Scott Sutherland Building, and housed the Scott Sutherland School of Architecture and Built Environment and some departments of Gray's School of Art. The School of Architecture moved to the Ian Wood building (see above) in Summer 2015 and the building was renamed Garthdee House Annexe. It still houses departments of the School of Art, as well as general purpose classrooms and lecture theatres.

The building consists of major 20th century extensions to the Victorian villa of Garthdee House, originally designed to provide space for the architecture school. The building's design and construction are typical of the era in which each part was constructed. The first extension was opened in 1957 when the School moved to Garthdee. This 1950s section is typical of modernist educational architecture in 1950s Britain; the exterior is faced with plate-glass with teal opaque sections for walls and large expanses of clear glass for the large windows. It was designed by Tom Scott Sutherland's architectural company at no profit, as part of his donation of the site, with Ian Fraser as principal architect. It featured studios which looked south over the lawn of Garthdee House and down to the riverbank.

By the late 1960s, this lawn had been built on by further extensions, the first phase opening in 1969 and the second phase in 1971, leaving only a small lawn in a quadrangle enclosed on all four sides. The 1960s/early 1970s extensions were designed by local architects Thomson, Taylor, Craig and Donald in a very different style to the 1957 section. Like many British buildings of that era, main external materials for these sections are white concrete and brick, with smaller use of dark ceramic tile, but with dramatic jagged roofline to allow skylights on the south and west wings. These new sections provided new laboratories, lecture theatres, workshops, staff offices and other facilities. These were required following the decision of the Royal Institute of British Architects in 1958 that future architectural training should be at degree-level, and to provide new courses in surveying and other areas of the built environment such as building economics.

Central Services Building 

Immediately adjacent to the Scott Sutherland Building and between it and the riverbank, the Central Services Building is an administrative building housing Human Resources, Finance, Accommodation Services, and various other support departments. It opened in 2008 and was designed by the architectural firm RMJM (which had designed many university campuses, most famously those at the University of Stirling and University of York in the 1960s). The building takes the form of a rectangular timber-clad "tube", with a recessed ground floor. The building contains 2000 square metres of office space, and each floor contains mainly open-plan offices but with some individual offices. The top floor has meeting rooms and a terrace giving views over the Dee valley and surrounding landscape. The recessed ground floor and brise-soleils over the north/south-facing windows on upper floors are designed to minimize solar gain and so reduce over-heating in summer (and thus reduce the need for air-conditioning). The building forms the first part of a plan to replace the Scott Sutherland building and redevelop that site on the campus, of which the Central Services Building forms the southern boundary. Prior to the building's construction, a car park had been located on the site.

Gray's School of Art building 

The Gray's School of Art building opened in 1966 to allow the art school to expand from its Victorian building next to the Aberdeen Art Gallery in the city centre (now used as the university's Administration Building). The current building is an example of High Modernism and was designed by Michael Shewan, constructed entirely of steel and glass, with some minor use of brick at end walls. The building was heavily influenced by the Illinois Institute of Technology campus (particularly the S. R. Crown Hall), designed by the celebrated American modernist architect Ludwig Mies van der Rohe.  Shewan worked for Tom Scott Sutherland's architectural practice and took it over after his death in 1963 (Scott Sutherland was the former owner of Garthdee House who donated it in the 1950s to the future university and for whom the current Scott Sutherland building is named). Much of Shewan's work demonstrated Mies' influence and ideas of modernism prevalent in architecture at the time. Gray's School of Art has been acclaimed by architectural critics and is one of the 60 DoCoMoMo Key Scottish Monuments, a list of notable Scottish post-war buildings selected as significant examples of architectural style, building materials and location.

The building consists of a three-storey main block with perpendicular single-storey wings to each side. These wings rest on solid ground close to the main section of the building, but as the ground slopes away they are carried on slender steel columns. These three sides surround a quadrangle with a lawn and a small pond. Originally, the open side of this quadrangle led down via steps to a paved terrace and then onto the grass bank leading down to the River Dee; the side wings carried over the landscape produced a striking visual impact when seen from the riverbank. In the 1990s a temporary extension was constructed on this terrace and enclosed the southern side of the quadrangle, intended to relieve a shortage of space in the art school (which still requires to occupy part of the neighboring Scott Sutherland building). The building is supported by an external steel skeleton which permits floor-to-ceiling windows for its numerous studios and workshops. These facilities include studios for painting and drawing, printmaking, photography, ceramics, jewellery, 3D design, as well as computer labs, life model changing rooms, two large open-plan sculpture studios, a cafeteria and an art shop, which supplies art materials required by the students and staff. The building has suffered various unsympathetic changes and add-ons (primarily for storage or additional workshop space) that have compromised the original modernist design, and is currently in a state of disrepair due to lack of maintenance. It was considered for listed status by Historic Scotland in 2014; the University plans to demolish the building and has repeatedly attacked attempts to list the building for preservation.

Other buildings 
Other modern buildings on campus (and older buildings that had once been part of the estate) provide for administration, healthcare, student support, a campus nursery for the children of staff and students, printing and design service and religious facilities. The campus includes extensive parkland, trees and meadows.

Transport 
The campus is served by First Aberdeen bus routes 1 and 2.

References

 
Education in Aberdeen